Isaac Benjamin is a former cricketer who played first-class cricket for Tobago in 1978–79.

When Tobago was promoted to first-class status for its inclusion in the Texaco Cup competition in 1978-79 alongside the four regional Trinidad sides, Benjamin was appointed captain and played in all four matches. He was Tobago's second-most successful bowler, taking 10 wickets at an average of 25.40, and Tobago's second-most successful batsman, scoring 119 runs at an average of 17.00. Tobago finished winless at the bottom of the competition and played no further first-class cricket, and neither did Benjamin.

References

External links
 

20th-century births
Living people
Tobagonian cricketers
Year of birth missing (living people)